Frederick Kyereh (born 18 October 1993) is a German footballer who plays for Jeunesse Esch in the Luxembourg National Division.

External links

1993 births
Living people
German footballers
German sportspeople of Ghanaian descent
SV Elversberg players
3. Liga players
Association football forwards
Sportspeople from Saarbrücken